Mass media in Hungary includes a variety of online, print, and broadcast formats, such as radio, television, newspapers, and magazines.

Press freedom
Press freedom has been declining under prime minister Viktor Orbán. In 2010, Freedom House's press freedom index ranked Hungary’s media as the world's 40th freest. As of 2017, the rank of Hungary’s media had dropped to 87th freest, and Freedom House says it is only "partly free."

Magazines

Newspapers

Television

See also
 Cinema of Hungary
 Telecommunications in Hungary
 Open access in Hungary to scholarly communication

References

Bibliography

External links
 
 

 
Hungary
Hungary